A Thing to Come By is an album by American jazz organist Jimmy McGriff featuring performances recorded in 1969 and originally released on the Solid State label.

Reception
The Allmusic review by Stephen Cook stated "A Thing to Come By is an essential part of the Jimmy McGriff catalog".

Track listing
All compositions by Jimmy McGriff except as indicated
 "A Thing to Come By" - 3:55
 "Charlotte" - 4:30
 "Down Home on the Moon" - 10:02
 "Oh Happy Day" (Edwin Hawkins) - 3:13
 "Don't Let Me Lose This Dream" (Aretha Franklin, Teddy White) - 5:20
 "Up There, Down Here" - 3:00
 "A Thing to Come By - Part II - 4:47

Personnel
Jimmy McGriff - piano, organ
Richard "Blue" Mitchell - trumpet
Arthur "Fats" Theus - tenor saxophone
Larry Frazier - guitar 
Danny Turner - alto saxophone
Jesse Kilpatrick - drums 
[mostly told: Phil Upchurch] - electric bass
Unknown - [?] baritone saxophone

References

Jimmy McGriff albums
1969 albums
Solid State Records (jazz label) albums
Blue Note Records albums
Albums produced by Sonny Lester